Polly Lawrence is an American politician and a former Republican member of the Colorado House of Representatives representing District 39 from January 9, 2013, to January 4, 2019.

Education
Lawrence graduated from Colorado State University.

Elections
2018 In July, 2017, Lawrence announced her candidacy for the Republican nomination for State Treasurer She lost in the primary election to fellow Republican Brian Watson.
2012 Redistricted to District 39, and with incumbent Republican Representative David Balmer running for Colorado Senate, Lawrence won the June 26, 2012 Republican Primary with 3,570 votes (53.5%); and won the three-way November 6, 2012 General election with 28,080 votes (64.6%) against Democratic nominee Carla Turner and Libertarian candidate Donna Price.
2010 When Republican Representative Mike May left the Legislature and left the District 44 seat open, Lawrence ran in the three-way August 10, 2010 Republican Primary, but lost to Chris Holbert, who went on to win the three-way November 2, 2010 General election.

References

External links
Official page at the Colorado General Assembly
State Treasurer campaign website
State Representative campaign site
 

Place of birth missing (living people)
Year of birth missing (living people)
Living people
Colorado State University alumni
Republican Party members of the Colorado House of Representatives
People from Douglas County, Colorado
Women state legislators in Colorado
21st-century American politicians
21st-century American women politicians